Matej Székely (born 12 May 1991) is a Slovak football goalkeeper who plays for Piešťany.

Club career 
He made his league debut on 26 May 2013 against Ružomberok.

References

1991 births
Living people
Slovak footballers
Association football goalkeepers
FC Spartak Trnava players
Slovak Super Liga players
Sportspeople from Trnava